Atham Chithira Chothy is a 1986 Indian Malayalam film, directed and produced by A. T. Abu. The film stars Mukesh, Nedumudi Venu, Nadiya Moithu and Innocent in the lead roles. The film has musical score by Shyam.

Cast

Mukesh as Rajan
Nedumudi Venu as Mukundan
Nadhiya Moidu
Innocent
Beena
Abutty
Lissy
Chithra
Kunjandi
Mala Aravindan
Sabitha Anand
T. G. Ravi
Valsala Menon

Soundtrack
The music was composed by Shyam and the lyrics were written by Poovachal Khader.

References

External links
 

1986 films
1980s Malayalam-language films
Films directed by A. T. Abu